The 2011–12 daytime network television schedule for four of the five major English-language commercial broadcast networks in the United States covers the weekday daytime hours from September 2011 to August 2012. The schedule is followed by a list per network of returning series, and any series canceled after the 2010–11 season.

Affiliates fill time periods not occupied by network programs with local or syndicated programming. PBS – which offers daytime programming through a children's program block, PBS Kids – is not included, as its member television stations have local flexibility over most of their schedules and broadcast times for network shows may vary. Also not included are stations affiliated with Fox (as the network does not air a daytime network schedule or network news expect on Sundays), MyNetworkTV (as the programming service also does not offer daytime programs of any kind), and Ion Television (as its schedule is composed mainly of syndicated reruns).

Legend

Schedule
 New series are highlighted in bold.
 All times correspond to U.S. Eastern and Pacific Time scheduling (except for some live sports or events). Except where affiliates slot certain programs outside their network-dictated timeslots, subtract one hour for Central, Mountain, Alaska, and Hawaii-Aleutian times.
 Local schedules may differ, as affiliates have the option to pre-empt or delay network programs. Such scheduling may be limited to preemptions caused by local or national breaking news or weather coverage (which may force stations to tape delay certain programs in overnight timeslots or defer them to a co-operated station or digital subchannel in their regular timeslot) and any major sports events scheduled to air in a weekday timeslot (mainly during major holidays). Stations may air shows at other times at their preference.

Monday-Friday

 Note: After Good Afternoon America aired its final broadcast on September 7, ABC turned the 3:00 p.m. ET hour over to its owned-and-operated stations and affiliates to accommodate syndicated programming.

Saturday

Sunday

By network

ABC

Returning series:
ABC World News
General Hospital
Good Morning America
One Life to Live
The View
This Week

New series:
The Chew
Good Afternoon America
The Revolution
Litton's Weekend Adventure
Jack Hanna's Wild Countdown
Ocean Mysteries with Jeff Corwin
Born to Explore with Richard Wiese
Culture Click
Everyday Health
Food for Thought with Claire Thomas
Sea Rescue

Not returning from 2010–11:
All My Children
   ABC Kids
The Emperor's New School 
Hannah Montana
The Replacements
The Suite Life of Zack and Cody
That's So Raven

CBS

Returning series:
The Bold and the Beautiful
CBS Evening News
CBS News Sunday Morning
The Early Show
Face the Nation
Let's Make a Deal
The Price Is Right
The Talk
The Young and the Restless
Cookie Jar TV
Busytown Mysteries
 Horseland

New series:
CBS This Morning
Cookie Jar TV
Danger Rangers
The Doodlebops

Not returning from 2010-11:
Cookie Jar TV
Doodlebops Rockin’ Road Show
Sabrina's Secret Life
Sabrina: The Animated Series
Trollz

The CW

Returning series:
Toonzai
Cubix: Robots for Everyone (reruns)
Dragon Ball Z Kai
Magi-Nation
Sonic X (reruns)
Yu-Gi-Oh! (reruns)
Yu-Gi-Oh! Capsule Monsters

New series:
Dr. Drew's Lifechangers
Toonzai
Tai Chi Chasers
Yu-Gi-Oh! Zexal

Not returning from 2010–11:
The Tyra Banks Show
Toonzai
Dinosaur King  
Yu-Gi-Oh! 5D's

FOX

Returning series:
Fox News Sunday
Fox Sports
Fox NFL
Fox NFL Sunday
Weekend Marketplace

New series:
MLB Player Poll

Not returning from 2010-11:
This Week In Baseball

NBC

Returning series:
Days of Our Lives
Meet the Press
NBC Nightly News
Today
Qubo (shared with Ion Television, ending June 30)
 Babar (reruns)
Jane and the Dragon (reruns)
The Magic School Bus (reruns)
Pearlie 
Shelldon 
Turbo Dogs
Willa's Wild Life
The Zula Patrol

New series:
NBC Kids (starting July 7)
Noodle and Doodle
Pajanimals
Poppy Cat
Justin Time
LazyTown
The Wiggles

Renewals and cancellations

Renewals

ABC
General Hospital—Renewed for a 50th season on April 11, 2012.

CBS
The Young and the Restless—Renewed for three additional seasons (encompassing the series' 38th, 39th and 40th seasons) on November 29, 2010.
The Bold and the Beautiful—Renewed for two additional seasons (encompassing the series' 48th and 49th seasons) on November 29, 2010.
The Talk—Renewed for a third season on November 29, 2010.

NBC
Days of Our Lives—Renewed for two seasons (encompassing the series' 46th and 47th seasons) on November 7, 2010.

Cancellations/series endings

ABC
One Life to Live—Canceled after 43 years on April 14, 2011; the series concluded its ABC run January 13, 2012.
The Revolution—Canceled on April 11, 2012; the series concluded on July 6, 2012.

The CW
Dr. Drew's Lifechangers—Canceled on February 10, 2012; the series concluded on May 11, 2012.

See also
2011–12 United States network television schedule (prime-time)
2011–12 United States network television schedule (late night)

References

Sources
 
 
 

United States weekday network television schedules
2011 in American television
2012 in American television